During the summer of 1609, Samuel de Champlain attempted to form better relations with the local native tribes. He made alliances with the Wendat (called Huron by the French) and with the Algonquin, the Montagnais, and the Etchemin, who lived in the area of the St. Lawrence River.  These tribes demanded that Champlain help them in their war against the Iroquois, who lived further south. Champlain set off with 9 French soldiers and 300 natives to explore the Rivière des Iroquois (now known as the Richelieu River), and became the first European to map Lake Champlain.  Having had no encounters with the Iroquois at this point many of the men headed back because of the danger of traveling in the country of their enemies, leaving Champlain with only 2 Frenchmen and 60 natives.

On July 29, somewhere on the western shore of what is now Lake Champlain and most likely near the site that would become Fort Ticonderoga, Champlain and his party encountered a group of Iroquois. A battle began the next day. Two hundred Iroquois advanced on Champlain's position, and one of his guides pointed out the 3 Iroquois chiefs. Champlain fired his arquebus, killing two of them with a single shot, and one of his men killed the third. The Iroquois turned and fled after a hail of arrows were let off on both sides, as the Hurons and Algonquins routed the enemy, killing fifty and taking twelve prisoners.

References

Works cited
 

Conflicts in 1608
New France
Iroquois
Military history of Canada
Wars involving the indigenous peoples of North America
Battles involving the Iroquois
Fur trade
Native American history of New York (state)
First Nations history in Quebec
1609 in North America
Battles in New York (state)
Pre-statehood history of New York (state)